Saving Zoë may refer to:
Saving Zoë (film), 2019
Saving Zoë (novel), by Alyson Noël